The Men's 200 metre freestyle competition of the 2020 European Aquatics Championships was held on 20 and 21 May 2021.

Records
Prior to the competition, the existing world, European and championship records were as follows.

The following new records were set during this competition.

Results

Heats
The heats were started on 20 May at 10:00.

Semifinals
The semifinals were started on 20 May at 18:20.

Semifinal 1

Semifinal 2

Final
The final was held on 21 May at 19:28.

References

Men's 200 metre freestyle

External links